Planctosphaera pelagica is a hemichordate and the only known representative of the class Planctosphaeroidea.

The species is known only by its free swimming larvae. The larvae are tornaria larvae similar to those of the closely related Enteropneusta, which possess a ciliated band to capture food particles. Planctosphaera pelagica is unique in possessing mucus secreting glands around the ciliated band. Possible uses of the mucus glands include assisting in feeding or deterring predators and parasites. Planctosphaera pelagica larvae are also larger than enteropneust larvae. It is due to the mucus glands and size difference they are usually given their own class.

References

Animal genera
Monotypic animal genera